'Poetry as Confession' was an influential article written by M. L. Rosenthal,  reviewing the poetry collection Life Studies by Robert Lowell.  The review is credited with being the first application of the term of confession to an approach to the writing of poetry.  This led to an entire movement of 20th Century poetry being called 'Confessional poetry'. The review was published in The Nation on 19 September 1959, and was later collected in Rosenthal's book of selected essays and reviews, Our Life In Poetry (1991). Some material from the essay was used in an essay Rosenthal published the following year in his book The Modern Poets: A Critical Introduction.

The review opens with a reference to Emily Dickinson and noting the new trend towards confession in poetry:

Rosenthal proceeds to compare the current day approach with that of the poets of the Romantic period such as John Keats.  The Romantics, he asserts, found "cosmic equations and symbols".  Keats transcended his "personal complaint", and lost it in the "music of universal folornness". Rosenthal introduces the adjective "confessional" when hew moves on to Walt Whitman and his Calamus poems:

T. S. Eliot and Ezra Pound are brought up, in the context of the influence of the Symbolists, and how they take us to the "forbidden realm" although "a certain indirection masks the poet's actual face and psyche".  But, Rosenthal continues,

See also
 1959 in poetry

References
 Rosenthal, M. L., Our Life in Poetry: Selected Essays and Reviews, Persea Books, New York, 1991, .

Footnotes

Essays about poetry
1959 documents
Works originally published in The Nation